The 2019 Norrbil Swedish FIM Speedway Grand Prix was the fourth race of the 2019 Speedway Grand Prix season. It took place on July 6 at the HZ Bygg Arena in Hallstavik, Sweden.

Riders 
First reserve Robert Lambert replaced the injured world champion Tai Woffinden, while second reserve Max Fricke replaced Greg Hancock. The Speedway Grand Prix Commission nominated Oliver Berntzon as the wild card, and Pontus Aspgren and Kim Nilsson both as Track Reserves.

Results 
The Grand Prix was won by Emil Sayfutdinov, who beat Martin Vaculík, Maciej Janowski and Max Fricke in the final. It was the seventh win of Sayfutdinov's career, but his first since 2013. The win also saw him move to the joint-lead of the overall standings, tied on 47 points with Patryk Dudek and Leon Madsen, who both failed to make the semi-finals.

Heat details

Intermediate classification

References 

2019
Sweden
2019 in Swedish motorsport
July 2019 sports events in Europe